Calacanthia trybomi is a species of shore bug in the family Saldidae. It is found in Europe and Northern Asia (excluding China) and North America.

References

Articles created by Qbugbot
Insects described in 1878
Saldoidini